3066 McFadden, provisional designation , is a stony background asteroid from the central regions of the asteroid belt, approximately  in diameter. It was discovered on 1 March 1984, by American astronomer Edward Bowell at the Anderson Mesa Station near Tucson, Arizona. It was named for American planetary scientist Lucy-Ann McFadden. The assumed S-type asteroid has a rotation period of 13.8 hours.

Orbit and classification 

McFadden is a non-family asteroid from the main belt's background population. It orbits the Sun in the central asteroid belt at a distance of 2.2–2.9 AU once every 4 years (1,466 days; semi-major axis of 2.53 AU). Its orbit has an eccentricity of 0.13 and an inclination of 16° with respect to the ecliptic.

Naming 

This minor planet was named after Lucy-Ann McFadden (born 1952), a planetary scientist at the University of Maryland at the time of naming. Her research included the similarities between the spectra of meteorites and near-Earth objects. The official naming citation was published by the Minor Planet Center on 14 April 1987.

Physical characteristics 

McFadden is an assumed, stony S-type asteroid.

Rotation period 

In June 2005, a rotational lightcurve of McFadden was obtained from photometric observations by American astronomer Brian Warner at his Palmer Divide Observatory in Colorado. Lightcurve analysis gave a rotation period of 13.798 hours with a brightness amplitude of 0.13 magnitude.

Diameter and albedo 

According to the surveys carried out by the Japanese Akari satellite and the NEOWISE mission of NASA's Wide-field Infrared Survey Explorer, McFadden measures between 13.526 and 15.63 kilometers in diameter and its surface has an albedo between 0.240 and 0.363.

The Collaborative Asteroid Lightcurve Link adopts Petr Pravec's revised WISE data with an albedo of 0.2541 and a diameter of 14.90 kilometers based on an absolute magnitude of 11.24.

Notes

References

External links 
 Lucy A. McFadden, University of Maryland
 Asteroid Lightcurve Database (LCDB), query form (info )
 Dictionary of Minor Planet Names, Google books
 Discovery Circumstances: Numbered Minor Planets (1)-(5000) – Minor Planet Center
 
 

003066
Discoveries by Edward L. G. Bowell
Named minor planets
19840301